The  is a river in Japan which flows through Gifu Prefecture. It is part of the Kiso River system.

Geography
The river originates in Kakamigahara, then flows through Gifu, Ginan, Kasamatsu and Hashima, where it flows into the Nagara River.

History
Up until the Sengoku Period, the lower portion of the Sakai River was the main part of the Kiso River. The river received its name, which means "border river," because it formed the border between Mino and Owari provinces.

References

Rivers of Gifu Prefecture
Rivers of Japan